Bryan-Michael Paul Cox (born December 1, 1977) is an American record producer and songwriter who is notable for his work with artists such as Usher, Mariah Carey, Mary J. Blige, and Toni Braxton.  Among his most notable productions are "Be Without You" for Mary J. Blige, "Burn", "Confessions Part II" and "U Got It Bad" for Usher, and "Shake It Off", "I Stay In Love" and "You Don't Know What To Do" for Mariah Carey.

While attending High School in Texas, Cox was good friends with Beyoncé, often producing records for the members of Destiny's Child before they signed with Columbia Records). From Texas, Cox relocated to Atlanta to pursue his professional music career and soon established a close working relationship with his frequent production partner Jermaine Dupri. Cox attained a Guinness World Records for the longest consecutive period of chart success by spending over 5 consecutive years there, breaking the record that was previously held by The Beatles.

In 2009, Cox was inducted into the Georgia Music Hall of Fame for his contribution to music.

Early life 
Cox has said that his mother played the flute: "My mom would buy music instead of food when I was little. We would spend her entire paycheck at the record store." He expressed his musical ambitions to her when he was seven years old, having written his first song when he was just six years old. Later, he enrolled in Houston's Kinder High School for the Performing and Visual Arts.

In high school, Cox met Beyoncé when he was a senior and she was a freshman. He recorded his first-ever demo tape with her. Although the two wouldn't reconnect until nearly seven years later when Bryan produced a track on Destiny's Child's Destiny Fulfilled, it was the early confirmation from Mathew Knowles that prompted Bryan to go into the music industry.

"Back then there was three choices if you wanted to be in the music industry, live in New York, LA, or Atlanta. I enrolled in Clark Atlanta University because although my Mom supported my dreams one hundred percent I had to go to college, so I chose Clark because I was just trying to get to Atlanta."

Career

1994–1999: Early career 
Cox began his career as an intern at Noontime Records in Atlanta, Georgia. He was discovered by his manager Chris Hicks, who was a partner in Noontime. Cox's first two hit singles as a producer were "Get Gone" & "Creep Inn" for the short-lived R&B group Ideal.

2000–2005: Confessions, The Emancipation of Mimi, The Breakthrough 
Cox contributed to Lil Bow Wow's debut album, Beware of Dog, writing the single "Puppy Love" and the Big Momma's House soundtrack. He worked with Jagged Edge's second studio album J.E. Heartbreak, contributing to songs "He Can't Love U" and "Let's Get Married". He contributed to Tamar Braxton's debut album, Tamar co-writing and producing "Get None" with musical partner Jermaine Dupri. He wrote and co-produced the second single "Just Be a Man About It" from Toni Braxton's third studio album, The Heat.

Cox worked with Usher, contributing to Confessions, co-writing and co-producing Billboard Hot 100 number-one songs "Burn" and "Confessions Part II". Confessions won Best Contemporary R&B Album at the 2005 Grammys. Confessions has been certified diamond by the Recording Industry Association of America (RIAA) and, as of 2012, has sold 10.3 million copies in the United States. It has sold over 20 million copies worldwide. He worked with Mariah Carey again on 2005's The Emancipation of Mimi with hits "Shake It Off" and "Don't Forget About Us". "Don't Forget About Us" was nominated for two Grammy Awards.
 He wrote the fourth single from Chris Brown's self-titled debut album "Say Goodbye". He co-wrote "Be Without You" the lead single from Mary J. Blige seventh studio album The Breakthrough. The single was certified double-platinum in the United States, was nominated for Record of the Year and Song of the Year and won the Best R&B Song and Best Female R&B Vocal Performance categories at the 49th Annual Grammy Awards.

2006–2009 
Cox co-wrote "Shortie Like Mine" the first single for Bow Wow's fifth studio album, The Price of Fame, in 2006. Again working with Austin together the duo co-wrote "Stay Down" for Mary J. Blige's eighth studio album, Growing Pains in 2007. Cox co-wrote "Last Time" for Trey Songz's second studio album Trey Day. Cox produced and co-wrote "Circles", the third single from Marques Houston's Veteran album. In 2008, he wrote five songs for the group Day26's self-tiled debut album, including the second single, "Since You've Been Gone".

2010–present 
In 2010, he co-wrote and produced "Never Let You Go", the single for My World 2.0, the debut studio album by Justin Bieber. For Mariah Carey he co-wrote and co-produced "Oh Santa!", alongside Jermaine Dupri and Carey, for her second Christmas/thirteenth studio album, Merry Christmas II You. He added songwriting and production on Usher's Grammy award-winning album Raymond vs Raymond. In the same year Cox co-produced the single "Love All Over Me", the single from Monica's sixth studio album, Still Standing. He worked on Love and War for Tamar Braxton in 2013. He worked with Johtna Austin co-writing for R. Kelly's thirteenth studio album The Buffet, and on Views for Drake. Cox co-wrote on Free TC for Ty $ Dolla Sign in 2016.

Legacy 
Cox went on to co-produce alongside his musical mentor Jermaine Dupri. He has had 35 number-one hits, 12 Grammy Award nominations, including nine wins, 20 top-ten hits, and eclipsing the record previously held by the Beatles for Billboard'''s most consecutive number-one hits. Cox has been named one of Billboards "Top 10 Producers of the Decade" and sits on Billboards "Hot R&B Song of the Decade List", "Hot 100 Songs of the Decade List", "Top 200 Albums of the Decade List" and is a 2009 Georgia Music Hall of Fame inductee. He has been awarded the Billboard'' Songwriter of the Year Award and the SESAC Songwriter of the Year Award six consecutive years.

Songwriting and producing credits

References

External links 
 Bryan's Instagram 
 

1977 births
Living people
African-American record producers
African-American songwriters
American hip hop record producers
American male songwriters
American rhythm and blues keyboardists
Clark Atlanta University alumni
Grammy Award winners
Musicians from Houston
Songwriters from Texas
High School for the Performing and Visual Arts alumni
American people of Bahamian descent
Record producers from Texas
21st-century African-American people
20th-century African-American people